Walter Gowers (first ¼ 1903 – third ¼ 1965) was a professional rugby league and association football (soccer) footballer who played in the 1920s, 1930s and 1940s. He played representative level rugby league (RL) for Great Britain (non-Test matches), and Lancashire, and at club level for Platt Lane ARLFC (in Wigan), the Rochdale Hornets (two spells), and St. Helens (Heritage № 450), as a goal-kicking , i.e. number 1, and club level association football (soccer) for Preston North End (reserves in 1926), as a full-back.

Background
Walter Gowers' birth was registered in Wigan district, Lancashire, England, he worked as a gardener, he lived at High Birch Terrace, Rochdale, and he died aged 62 in Rochdale district, Lancashire, England.

Playing career

International honours
Walter Gowers represented Great Britain in non-Test matches on the 1928 Great Britain rugby league tour of Australia and New Zealand, scoring 27-goals.

County honours
Walter Gowers represented Lancashire while at Rochdale Hornets, winning four County Championship medals.

Club career
Walter Gowers came out of retirement aged  to play one match for Rochdale Hornets against Wigan at Central Park, Wigan on Saturday 12 January 1946.

Career records
Walter Gowers holds Rochdale Hornets' "most appearances in a career" record with 456-appearances between 1922 and 1946, and holds Rochdale Hornets' "most points in a career" record with 1497-points scored between 1922 and 1946. He previously held Rochdale Hornets' "most goals in a season" record with 109-goals during the 1933–34 season, this record was extended by Graham Starkey during the 1966–67 season.

Genealogical information
Walter Gowers' marriage to Mary E. (née Prescott) was registered during first ¼ 1929 in Chorley district. They had children; Winifred J. Gowers (birth registered third ¼ 1930 in Rochdale district), John Gowers (birth registered first ¼ 1934 in Wigan district), and the rugby league footballer; Ken Gowers. Walter Gowers was the great-grandfather of the Middlesex and England cricketer John Simpson (Ken Gowers' grandson).

References

External links
Profile at saints.org.uk
Rochdale Hornets statistics at greyhoundderby.com

1903 births
1965 deaths
English rugby league players
Footballers from Wigan
Footballers who switched code
Great Britain national rugby league team players
Lancashire rugby league team players
Rochdale Hornets players
Rugby league fullbacks
Rugby league players from Wigan
St Helens R.F.C. players
Association football fullbacks
Association football players not categorized by nationality